Prednimustine, sold under the brand names Mostarina and Sterecyst, is a medication which is used in chemotherapy in the treatment of leukemias and lymphomas. It is the ester formed from two other drugs, prednisolone and chlorambucil. Rarely, it has been associated with myoclonus.

See also
 List of hormonal cytostatic antineoplastic agents
 List of corticosteroid esters

References

Primary alcohols
Anilines
Antineoplastic drugs
Carboxylate esters
Corticosteroids
Corticosteroid esters
Diketones
Nitrogen mustards
Organochlorides
Chloroethyl compounds